Donald "Don" Worden is a retired Baltimore Police Department detective who was featured in David Simon's non-fiction book about the homicide unit, Homicide: A Year on the Killing Streets (1991) and provided the inspiration for the Homicide: Life on the Street television series character Stanley Bolander, played by Ned Beatty.

Biography
Worden, a native of Baltimore's Hampden neighborhood, joined the Baltimore Police Department in 1962, and had worked in the department's Northwestern district before becoming a Homicide Detective. Nicknamed, "The Big Man", he was a veteran member of Sergeant Terry McLarney's Homicide squad working under Shift Lieutenant Gary D'Addario.

References

Bibliography
 

Living people
United States Navy sailors
Baltimore Police Department officers
American police detectives
Year of birth missing (living people)
People from Baltimore